Modi is a surname in India, most commonly found among people from states of Rajasthan, Gujarat, Bihar, Chhattisgarh, Haryana, Madhya Pradesh, Jharkhand, and Uttar Pradesh. 

Notable people with the surname include:
 Asit Kumarr Modi, founder and director of Neela Tele Films
 B. K. Modi, chairman of Spice Global
 Gujarmal Modi  (1902–1976), India industrialist and philanthropist, founder of Modinagar
 Hitesh Modi (born 1971), Kenyan cricketer
 Ishwar Modi (born 1940), Indian sociologist
 Jashodaben Modi (born 1952), wife of Narendra Modi
 Jivanji Jamshedji Modi (1854–1933), Indian Zoroastrian priest
 Kal Penn, stage name of Kalpen Modi, American actor
 Karishma Modi (born 1980), Indian model and actress
 Krishan Kumar Modi (born 1940), Indian businessman
 Lalit Modi, Chief Commissioner of Indian Premier League
 Murugappa Channaveerappa Modi (1916–2005), Indian eye surgeon
 Narendra Modi, Prime Minister of India
 Nirav Modi, Indian fugitive jeweller 
 Russi Mody, chairman of Tata Steel
 Rusi Modi, Indian cricketer
 Samir Modi (born 1969), Indian entrepreneur
 Sohrab Modi, Indian actor
 Subhash Modi (born 1946), Kenyan cricket umpire
 Sushil Kumar Modi, Indian politician
 Virali Modi (born 1991), disability rights activist

Social groups of Rajasthan
Gujarati-language surnames